Maurice Le Guilloux (born 14 May 1950) is a French former racing cyclist. He rode in eleven Grand Tours between 1975 and 1984. He spent much of his career as a domestique for fellow Breton cyclist Bernard Hinault and subsequently became a directeur sportif at La Vie Claire. However Le Guilloux and Hinault's friendship was damaged by the events of the 1986 Tour de France, where Le Guilloux was the directeur sportif responsible for Hinault's rival and team-mate at La Vie Claire, Greg LeMond.

References

External links
 

1950 births
Living people
French male cyclists
Sportspeople from Côtes-d'Armor
Cyclists from Brittany